FK Vranjska Banja (Serbian Cyrillic: ФК Врањска Бања) is a football club from Vranjska Banja, Serbia. The club competes in the Zone League South, the fourth tier of the national league system.

History
The club participated once in the Serbian League East under the name FK Železničar, finishing in eight place in the 2007–08 season. They were later renamed as FK Vranjska Banja, winning the Pčinja District League in the 2014–15 season.

Honours
Pčinja District League
 2014–15

External links
 Club page at fspo.rs
 Club page at srbijasport.net

Football clubs in Serbia
Railway association football clubs in Serbia